Malcolm Upshur "Mac" Pitt (January 10, 1897 – September 16, 1985) was an American football, basketball, and baseball coach and college athletics administrator. At the University of Richmond he served as the head men's basketball coach from 1933 to 1952, the head baseball coach from 1935 to 1971, and the athletic director from 1942 to 1967. Pitt was also the head football coach for two seasons, from 1943 to 1944. Pitt's 1934–35 basketball squad finished a perfect 20–0, the only unbeaten Spider basketball team in history. As a student at Richmond from 1915 to 1918, Pitt played football and baseball and ran on the track team.

Honors and death
Pitt was elected to the American Baseball Coaches Association Hall of Fame in 1971 and the Virginia Sports Hall of Fame in 1974. Malcolm U. Pitt Field, the baseball stadium at Richmond, is named in Pitt's honor. He died after a brief illness in 1985 at a Richmond hospital.

Head coaching record

Football

Basketball

References

External links
 

1897 births
1985 deaths
Richmond Spiders athletic directors
Richmond Spiders baseball coaches
Richmond Spiders baseball players
Richmond Spiders football coaches
Richmond Spiders football players
Richmond Spiders men's basketball coaches
College men's track and field athletes in the United States
Players of American football from Richmond, Virginia